The 2018 Patriot League men's basketball tournament was the postseason men's basketball tournament for the Patriot League for the 2017–18 NCAA Division I men's basketball season. It was held on February 27, March 1, 4, and 7, 2018 with the higher seed in each matchup hosting at their respective campus sites. 

Bucknell defeated Colgate in the championship game to win the tournament and received the conference's automatic bid to the NCAA tournament.

Seeds
All 10 Patriot League teams were eligible for the tournament. The top six teams received a first round bye. Teams were seeded by record within the conference, with a tiebreaker system to seed teams with identical conference records.

With a win over Loyola (MD) on February 14, 2018, Bucknell clinched the Patriot League regular season championship for the seventh time in the previous eight years and earned the No. 1 seed.

Schedule

Bracket

References

Patriot League men's basketball tournament
Tournament
Patriot League men's basketball tournament
Patriot League men's basketball tournament